The 2010 FC Tampa Bay season was the first and inaugural season of FC Tampa Bay and only season in the USL Conference of the USSF Division 2 Professional League, the second tier of the American Soccer Pyramid. The USSF D-2 was a temporary professional soccer league created by the United States Soccer Federation (USSF) in 2010 to last just one season, as a compromise between the feuding United Soccer Leagues (USL) and the North American Soccer League (NASL).

Review
The team won its first official game on April 16, 2010, 1–0, over Crystal Palace Baltimore on a goal by striker Aaron King. The first home game, a 2–2 draw with Austin Aztex FC, was played at George M. Steinbrenner Field in Tampa on May 8, 2010.

The club got off to a fast start with a 5–1–3 record, but then slumped the rest of the way. They won only two of their final 21 games and failed to make the playoffs with a final record of 7–12–11. This led to dismissal of manager Paul Dalglish, with Perry Van der Beck finishing the season as interim manager. Positives from the season included capturing the inaugural Coastal Cup versus Miami FC. They also took home the 2010 Ponce De Leon Cup, which was contested between Miami FC, the Puerto Rico Islanders and FC Tampa Bay.

Club

Current roster
as of August 10, 2010

Staff
  Perry Van der Beck - Head Coach

Preseason

USSF D-2

USL Conference standings

Results summary

Matches

Ponce De Leon Cup 
The Ponce De Leon Cup was a fan-based derby and trophy that was created in 2006. Participants were originally United Soccer Leagues first division teams (later USSF-D2, then NASL teams) based in lands that Spanish explorer Juan Ponce de León had visited; namely Florida and Puerto Rico. It was awarded to the club with the best record in league games versus the other participants. FC Tampa Bay and Puerto Rico were level on points, wins, goal differential, head-to-head meetings, goals for, and goals against. Tampa Bay was declared the winner by virtue of scoring five away goals to the Islanders' three.

U.S. Open Cup

Bracket 

Second Round winners advance to play one of 8 MLS clubs in 16-team knockout tournament
Home teams listed on top of bracket

Games

References

2010
American soccer clubs 2010 season
USSF Division 2 Professional League
FC Tampa Bay
Sports in Tampa, Florida